Reflections of Murder is a 1974 made-for-TV movie that was produced by ABC.  A suspense-thriller film, it is a remake of the classic 1955 French film Les Diaboliques.  John Badham directed, from Carol Sobieski's script.  The cast was led by Tuesday Weld, Joan Hackett and Sam Waterston in the primary roles.  Reflections of Murder was released to home video on the VHS format in the 1980s, but has not yet received an official DVD release.

Plot

Claire Elliot is the abused wife of vicious schoolmaster Michael, who takes great delight in belittling and emotionally abusing her both in public and in private. Michael is also openly carrying on an affair with one of the school's teachers, Vicky, who he sometimes physically assaults. Having grown tired of his cruelty, the two women conspire to murder him and stage the act to look like an accident.  But after committing the deed his body disappears, and the women begin to fear that someone might be trying to drive them mad.

Cast
 Tuesday Weld as Vicky 
 Joan Hackett as Claire Elliott
 Sam Waterston as Michael Elliott
 Lucille Benson as Mrs. Turner 
 Michael Lerner as Jerry Steele
 R.G. Armstrong as Mr. Turner
 Ed Bernard as Coroner 
 William Turner as Mr. Griffiths
 Lance Kerwin as Chip

Remakes

Two more remakes followed.  The first was House of Secrets, another made-for-TV adaptation that was broadcast in 1993, starring Melissa Gilbert, Bruce Boxleitner, Kate Vernon, and Cicely Tyson.    In 1996 Warner Bros. released a theatrical reworking of the material under the title Diabolique, scripted by Don Roos, directed by Jeremiah Chechik, and starring Sharon Stone, Isabelle Adjani, Chazz Palminteri, and Kathy Bates.

References

External links

1974 television films
1974 films
American remakes of French films
Films based on French novels
Films based on works by Boileau-Narcejac
Films directed by John Badham
Films scored by Billy Goldenberg
American thriller television films
Henri-Georges Clouzot
1970s American films